George Perry may refer to:

George Perry (composer) (1793–1862), English composer
George Perry (engineer) (1719–1771), English engineer, ironmaster, draughtsman and cartographer
George Perry (Ontario politician) (1818–1891), Ontario MPP
George Perry (naturalist) (1771–?), English naturalist
George Perry (neuroscientist) (born 1953), American neuroscientist
George Perry (priest) (1820–1897), English churchman and historian 
George Perry (British politician) (1920–1998), British Labour MP
George Perry (American economist) (born 1934), American macroeconomist
George "Chocolate" Perry, American bassist, producer and sound mixer
George Sessions Perry (1910–1956), American novelist, World War II correspondent and magazine contributor